Brian McCormack is a Gaelic footballer from County Laois.

He plays for the Portlaoise club. He usually plays at wing back for the Laois senior football team.

Brian emerged on to the inter-county GAA scene in 1997 as part of the Laois minor squad that retained the All-Ireland Minor Football Championship. He captained Portlaoise to the Leinster Club title in 2009.

He has also played for the Laois senior county hurling team.

For Portlaoise against Stradbally in a 2013 league game, he was struck in the mouth from behind and required dental intervention.

He has won 15 Laois Senior Football club titles and 1 Laois Senior Hurling club titles.

References

Year of birth missing (living people)
Living people
Dual players
Laois inter-county Gaelic footballers
Laois inter-county hurlers
Portlaoise Gaelic footballers
Portlaoise hurlers